The Bradford derby is a football derby match played between Bradford City and Bradford (Park Avenue).

The derby has also been called the Wool City derby, referring to Bradford's history with the wool trade. The two clubs are the only two from Bradford to have played professional league football.

The rivalry was first played in 1912 in the FA Cup, and there were 56 competitive matches between the teams, ending in 1969.

The fixture is now played as a regular friendly, and the Tom Banks Memorial Trophy is awarded to the winner of this match.

History
Bradford City had been elected to the Football League ready for the 1903–04 season. Their cross-city rivals Bradford (Park Avenue) joined the league five years later, for the same season as City's first in Division One.

The first game between the two teams was on 19 November 1907, a 2-1 win for City.

The first all-Bradford league match took place at Valley Parade on 23 October 1914 in Division One in front of a crowd of 29,802, when City won 3–2. Park Avenue won the reverse fixture 3–0.

The clubs met in the top flight just four more times before Park Avenue were relegated in 1920–21. City were themselves relegated to Division Two but a second successive relegation for Park Avenue meant the clubs did not meet again until 1927 in Division Three (North). That season's derby saw Park Avenue record a record 5–0 for a Bradford derby on their way to the title and promotion. City kept the title in Bradford the following season.

Between the 1929–30 and 1936–37 seasons the clubs continued their rivalries until City were relegated, one place below Park Avenue. The derby was resumed from 1950–51 to 1957–58 in Division Three (North), a period which included an FA Cup tie in December 1951 and a record 5–0 win for City at home on 16 April 1956. A league restructure meant the clubs did not meet again in the league again until the 1963–64 season in Division Four, although the teams did meet again in the FA Cup in December 1958 and the League Cup in September 1963, when Park Avenue were 7–3 winners.

The teams met on six successive seasons until 1968–69 when City were promoted to Division Three in fourth spot and Park Avenue had to seek re-election when they came bottom of the league.

The final derby was on 25 January 1969, a goalless draw. There were a total of 56 derby games - 52 in the league and 4 in the Cup.

The following season Park Avenue failed a fourth successive re-election and were replaced by Cambridge United, before they went into liquidation in 1974 and the teams have never met in competitive football since.

In modern times, the teams have sometimes participated in a pre-season friendly.

Results

Statistics
Statistics are correct as of 25 January 1969.

League

Cup

Crossing the divide

The following is a list of players who have represented both clubs in at least one senior fixture.

References

England football derbies
Bradford City A.F.C.
Bradford (Park Avenue) A.F.C.
Sport in Bradford
Football in West Yorkshire